Tillandsia filifolia is a species of flowering plant in the genus Tillandsia. This species is native to Costa Rica and Mexico.

References

filifolia
Flora of Costa Rica
Flora of Mexico
Taxa named by Adelbert von Chamisso